The Golden Thread Gallery is a contemporary art space in Belfast, Northern Ireland. It hosts contemporary art exhibitions and participatory events by a mix of Northern Irish and international artists; six large-scale exhibitions in the main gallery spaces and twelve exhibitions in its project space.  It also facilitates exhibitions of Northern Irish art in other venues across the globe.

The Golden Thread Gallery was established in 1998 by Gail Prentice in a former linen mill on an 'interface area' (an area where segregated nationalist and unionist residential areas meet) in North Belfast. In 2001, it  was reconstituted to become the Golden Thread Gallery Ltd., a limited company with charitable status. In 2002, Peter Richards, artist and curator, was appointed as the gallery's new director.

Gallery outreach activities include working off-site and in partnership with communities and groups, devising projects in addition to providing artists’ talks, gallery tours and workshops. The gallery also publishes exhibition catalogues and books.

In recent years the Golden Thread Gallery has been working with a number of artists living and working in Northern Ireland to create a “not-for-profit” form of artists’ representation and has championed their work at art fairs such as the London Art Fair, Berliner Liste and Scope New York as well as establishing a dedicated in-house sales room. Golden Thread Gallery is a member of Plus Tate, a network of 35 contemporary art galleries and organisations based throughout the UK.

The Golden Thread Gallery is free to the public and is funded by the Arts Council of Northern Ireland, National Lottery, Belfast City Council and supported by RMI and ASHP YEHA.

Staff
CEO and Creative Director - Peter Richards
Gallery Manager - Sarah McAvera
Exhibitions Officer - Mary Stevens
Development & Fundraising Officer - Liz Byrne
Gallery Assistant - Katharine Paisley

References

External links 

 Arts Council of Northern Ireland Website

Art museums and galleries in Northern Ireland
Buildings and structures in Belfast
Culture in Belfast
Art galleries established in 1998
1998 establishments in Ireland